Robert Grzegorczyk (born 19 February 1973) is a Polish former competitive figure skater. He is an eight-time Polish national champion. 

Grzegorczyk started skating at age seven in Gdańsk and moved to Łódź at 14. He retired from competitive skating following the 2000–01 season. He has a degree as a sport teacher from the Academy of Warsaw.

Programs

Results

References

External links
 

1973 births
Living people
Polish male single skaters
Sportspeople from Gdańsk
Competitors at the 2001 Winter Universiade